Afonsinho is a Portuguese masculine name, a diminutive of the male given name Afonso. 

People using this name include:

People
 Afonso Guimarães da Silva (born 1914; nicknamed "Afonsinho") Brazilian soccer player
 Afonso Celso Garcia Reis (born 1947; nicknamed "Afonsinho") Brazilian soccer player

Characters
 , a Brazilian comic book character created by J. Carlos, in José Carioca comics

See also

 , Figueira de Castelo Rodrigo, Guarda; named after Afonso I of Portugal.
 
 Afonso